Bernacice  is a village located in Poland, in the Opole Voivodeship, Głubczyce County and Gmina Głubczyce.

Location

See also
 Bernacice Górne

External links
 

Villages in Głubczyce County